PSECU (also known as Pennsylvania State Employees Credit Union) is a state-chartered credit union headquartered in Harrisburg, Pennsylvania.  PSECU is a not-for-profit financial entity that serves more than 480,000 members and manages over $7.5 billion in assets. Deposits by the members are regulated and insured by National Credit Union Administration (NCUA).

History 
PSECU was started in 1934 by 22 state employees who pooled $90 in assets to found the credit union and provide better lives for their families.

In 2022, PSECU was named as the Best-In-State credit union for the fourth year by Forbes. That same year, PSECU's president and chief executive officer, George Rudolph, was named to the Banking & Finance Power List. PSECU's management philosophy in 2022 was described, in part, by Barb Bowker, PSECU's chief member experience officer, as follows: "Tapping into someone’s emotions — giving them a truly great experience as a member — is what builds loyalty and helps retain members for a lifetime."

See also 

 State ECU
 State Employees Credit Union of Maryland
 State Employees Credit Union (North Carolina)
 S.C. State Credit Union
 Washington State Employees Credit Union

References

External links
Official website.

Credit unions based in Pennsylvania
Companies based in Harrisburg, Pennsylvania
Banks established in 1933
1933 establishments in Pennsylvania